Spirit in the U.S. state of Wisconsin may refer to:
 Spirit, Wisconsin, a town
 Spirit (community), Wisconsin, an unincorporated community
 Spirit Falls, Wisconsin, an unincorporated community